Justin Robinson (born March 30, 2002) is an American sprinter specializing in the 400 meters. He set the world under-18 best in the boys' 400 meters in June 2019 with a time of 44.84 seconds. He was the 2019 Pan American under-20 champion in the men's 400 meters, and helped set the world under-20 record in winning the men's 4 × 400 meters relay for the United States, splitting 43.7 seconds on the last lap for a time of 2:59.30.

Robinson has additionally won medals at the 2019 Pan American Games, earning a bronze medal in the 400 meters and a silver in the 4 × 400 meters relay, as well as a silver at the 2018 World Under-20 Championships in the 4 × 400 meters relay.

Biography
Robinson's speed was noticed after winning a footrace and playing football with a cousin in his freshman year of high school, who introduced him to track and field.

Robinson set a new Boy's World Youth Best of 44.84 seconds over 400 metres on June 8, 2019. It was the fastest 400-meter time for an American high schooler since Darrell Robinson in 1982.

At the 2018 IAAF World U20 Championships in Tampere, Finland, Robinson won a silver medal as part of the men's 4×400 m relay squad.

He graduated from Hazelwood West High School in Hazelwood, Missouri in May 2020. He signed a letter of intent to attend Arizona State University.

His 2020 season was limited due to the COVID-19 pandemic, but in his only 400 m race he ran 44.91 s, the fastest time in the world that year.

References

External links 

2002 births
Living people
Sportspeople from St. Louis County, Missouri
African-American male track and field athletes
American male sprinters
Track and field athletes from Missouri
Athletes (track and field) at the 2019 Pan American Games
Pan American Games bronze medalists for the United States
Pan American Games silver medalists for the United States
Pan American Games medalists in athletics (track and field)
Pan American Games track and field athletes for the United States
Medalists at the 2019 Pan American Games
21st-century African-American sportspeople